Grace Alexandra Rood (1893–1981) was a notable New Zealand school dental nurse. She was born in Hampden, Hawke's Bay, New Zealand in 1893.

References

1893 births
1981 deaths
People from the Hawke's Bay Region